Union Sportive Pont-de-Roide Vermondans is a French association football team founded in 2003. They are based in Pont-de-Roide, Franche-Comté, France and are currently playing in the Championnat de France Amateurs 2 Group B, the fifth tier in the French football league system. They play at the Stade Municipal in Pont-de-Roide.

Awards
 Championship Division honor of Franche-Comté
 Winner 1980, 1990 and 2006.
 Cup of Franche-Comté
 Winner 1992, 1993 and 2002.

References

Association football clubs established in 2003
2003 establishments in France
Sport in Doubs
Football clubs in Bourgogne-Franche-Comté